Antiphytum, commonly known as saucerflower, is a genus of flowering plants belonging to the family Boraginaceae.

Its native range is Texas to Mexico and from Brazil to Uruguay.

Species:

Antiphytum bornmuelleri 
Antiphytum caespitosum 
Antiphytum charruasorum 
Antiphytum ehrenbergii 
Antiphytum floribundum  - Texas saucerflower
Antiphytum geoffreyi 
Antiphytum heliotropioides  - Mexican saucerflower
Antiphytum hintoniorum 
Antiphytum humilis 
Antiphytum nudicalces 
Antiphytum paniculatum 
Antiphytum parryi 
Antiphytum peninsulare 
Antiphytum stoechadifolium

References

Boraginaceae
Boraginaceae genera